is a Japanese light novel series written by Tarō Hitsuji and illustrated by Kurone Mishima. Fujimi Shobo has published twenty-one volumes since July 2014 under their Fujimi Fantasia Bunko imprint. A manga adaptation with art by Aosa Tsunemi has been serialized in Kadokawa Shoten's shōnen manga magazine Monthly Shōnen Ace from March 26, 2015, to June 25, 2021, and has been collected in sixteen tankōbon volumes. An anime television series adaptation by Liden Films aired from April to June 2017.

Synopsis
Sistine Fibel and her best friend Rumia Tingel are students at a prestigious magical academy, where Sistine hopes to be trained by the best in order to unravel the secrets of the mysterious Sky Castle as per her grandfather's last wish. When her favorite instructor suddenly retired, his replacement Glenn Radars is anything but what Sistine had hoped for. The "Bastard Magic Instructor" (BMI) appears to be lazy, incompetent, and not that skilled at magic. He is not a certified teacher nor does he have a high rating in the guild. What they do not know is that he is hiding his power and that he is a former assassin from the Imperial Court Mage Corps with a remorseful past who is suffering severe depression. In episode 2 there is an attack on school by the previous instructor, and the BMI is forced to show his true powers. Sistine is baffled as she had misjudged him to be incompetent. As the BMI's students draw him out of his depression, he finds meaning in the activity of teaching. This whole season is complete with a promise for eventful things to come. Topics that are dealt with are depression, friendship, family relationships, adoption, siblings, following one's dream, quest for power and more.

Characters

Glenn is lazy, pervy and constantly bored by everything, with his primary focus being sleeping. He becomes the substitute teacher in Sistine's class, after the retirement of her favorite teacher. While he may seem incompetent, he is actually very skilled in magic, but not in the traditional sense. Glenn used to be as passionate about magic as Sistine, but became disillusioned by it due to his former partner Sara Silvers' death and his past as the infamous military assassin known as "The Fool." He developed his own type of magic, called "The Fool's World" which negates the activation of all magic within a certain radius, including his own. However, this does not nullify spells that have already been cast. While nullifying the enemies' magic he then beats them using superior hand-to-hand combat skills. He cannot use combat magic coherently due to it being far away from his area of expertise, but he has an in-depth understanding of the concept of all types of magic, which makes him a good instructor. This also places him in conflict with the traditional Professors who favor rote memorization.

Sistine admires magic greatly and wishes to discover the secret of the Flying Castle, which no one knows. She maintains a strict, no-nonsense demeanor throughout, and often scolds Glenn for his lackadaisical attitude. She initially hates Glenn, believing him to be as incompetent as he looked due to his lack of enthusiasm. When he actually starts doing his job, however, she begrudgingly begins to respect Glenn as a highly effective teacher. Her personality and appearance resembles Sara Silvers, to whom Glenn was very close. As the series progresses, it seems as though Sistine has developed feelings for Glenn, but is too shy to speak of them. She is called "Sisti" by her sister Rumia, and "Punchie" (for her swift magical strikes) and "White Cat" (for her hair style) by Glenn.

Rumia is Sistine's best friend and adopted sister. Sistine's parent adopted her after she was the sole survivor of an attack of evil mages. She is close to Glenn, who often treats her well, in contrast to the teasing that Sistine faces from him. Rumia's real identity is the Princess Ermiana, the "cursed" princess who was supposed to have died three years ago. She remembered Glenn being the infamous assassin named "The Fool" who saved her life and that is why she is fond of him from the start. Rumia possesses a high level of spiritual essence as well as a unique ability known as Amplifier, which, as the name suggests, amplifies her spiritual essence. 

Celica is an immortal mage and a professor at the academy. She adopted and apprenticed Glenn at a very young age and as such, she puts in a recommendation for him to be the substitute teacher despite his profile suggesting that he is unfit for the job. She forces Glenn to take the job against his will, hopeful that it may provide fulfillment to his life. She is a retired legendary Court Mage. 

A long-haired military magician with sharp eyes who is known as "The Star". He is partners with Re=L and another former colleague of Glenn, whose aid he occasionally enlists for military operations. He cares for his colleagues, but does not easily reveal or share these feelings out loud.

Re=L is a gluttonous girl with a stoic expression. She is known as "The Chariot", being highly skilled in creating giant swords through alchemy. She is an artificial human, a product of "Project: Revive Life", also known as "Project Re=L" which was led by Sion Rayford, the older brother of the girl from whom Re=L derives her appearance and memory. When Glenn and Albert shut the project down, they "adopted" her into the military. She did not know her true origins until later in the series. When she learns the truth and comes to accept it, she resolves to live on for Glenn's sake.

Voiced by: Sophie FRISON (French); Raquel Masuet (Portuguese)
A highly-skilled servant of Notorious Criminal Association secretly intended for assassination associated Queen Alicia VII and Rumia Tingel. The association which she serves were notified as a group of insane people who seeks wicked intentions for the most evil purposes against peaceful living of all people, especially their illegal and irregular purposes are deeply connected to misuse of akashic records for the destructive and awful desire, according to major military authorities.

Sara was a member of Imperial Court Mage Corps and held position #3, "The Empress" and a former partner to Glenn Radars. Not much is known about her past. She was very close friends with Glenn, being his only reason to stay with the Imperial Mage Corps. She died due to an attack by the hands of Angel Dust addicts. According to Glenn, she was a cheerful and ebullient person, and very frequently is noted to look like Glenn's student, Sistine. She was called "White Dog" by Glenn, much like how Sistine is called "White Cat".

 
He is a student of Class 4 in the Alzano Imperial Magic Academy.

A heretic mage and former Imperial Court Mage Corps member with the title "The Justice." He was responsible for the death of Glenn's former partner, Sara after being killed by a resident afflicted by Angel Dust during a mission to apprehend Jatice for his insurrection.

She is Glenn's superior and manager of the Imperial Mage Corps. In the past, she did not send reinforcements to Glenn and Sara, which in turn caused Sara's death. In the 7th volume, she met Glenn again and told him that she will show him that all of her opinions are right. Later she was saved by Glenn in the battle with Jatice and acts like a tsundere around him. In the 11th volume, she is an instructor and works together with Glenn. She shows some affections for Glenn, but tries to hide them.

She is the ruler of the Alzano Empire and the biological mother of Rumia Tingel. She is a beautiful mature woman with long daffodil blonde hair and eyebrows that is usually tied up in a bun and aqua blue eyes. She usually wears a long royal red gown with a gold line that goes down the middle of her chest to her stomach. Additionally, she wears two necklaces (one of the necklaces she wear have a pendant similar to Rumia's) and a gold colored choker. She is shown to love and care for her daughter greatly. She feels guilty about having to abandon her daughter, as seen when Rumia turned her away and she was seen wishing the latter would accept her again.

She is Alicia VII's ancestor and new director of the school where Glenn, Celica and Eve work as instructors. She was Queen of Alzano Empire, and also contributed development of 'Alzano Magic academy' as a founding member and first headmaster. Her primary concerns were relatively associated Magical archaeology, however, she became mad by secret behind the historic mystery of Empire. In history of empire's loyal family, she is the most wise person, though she was surrounded among several cursed and fearful rumors which created her image as the owner of cursed blood in the loyal family members. She warns Glenn not to use the backyard library as a battlefield.

Media

Light novels

Manga
The series has been licensed for an English release by Seven Seas Entertainment.

Anime
An anime adaptation was announced in March 2016, which was later revealed to be an anime television series. The series was produced by Liden Films and directed by Hiraku Kaneko, with Touko Machida writing the scripts, Satoshi Kimura designed the characters and Hiroaki Tsutsumi composed the music. It aired from April 4, 2017, to June 20, 2017. The series ran for 12 episodes. The series' opening theme is "Blow Out" by Konomi Suzuki, and the ending theme is "Precious You" by Akane Fujita, Yume Miyamoto, and Ari Ozawa. Crunchyroll has licensed the series in North America and is streaming it on their website, and Funimation released it on home video as part of the two companies' partnership.

See also
Last Round Arthurs, another light novel series by Taro Hitsuji

Footnotes

References

External links
  at Fujimi Shobo 
  at Monthly Shōnen Ace 
  
 

2017 anime television series debuts
2014 Japanese novels
Action anime and manga
Anime and manga based on light novels
Book series introduced in 2014
Crunchyroll anime
Fantasy anime and manga
Fujimi Fantasia Bunko
Funimation
Harem anime and manga
Kadokawa Dwango franchises
Kadokawa Shoten manga
Liden Films
Light novels
Medialink
Seven Seas Entertainment titles
Shōnen manga
Tarot in fiction